Joe Zimmerman Stadium is a 3,000-seat natural turf football/multipurpose stadium located on the campus of Archbishop Shaw High School. It is the home stadium for Archbishop Shaw athletics in addition to hosting sporting events for multiple area schools.

History
Groundbreaking for the stadium, originally named Archbishop Shaw High School Stadium, took place on November 1, 2017. The stadium opened in 2018 and was later renamed Joe Zimmerman Stadium on September 13, 2019 after former Archbishop Shaw head football coach, Joe Zimmerman. He served as head coach at the school from 1969 to 1982. 

From 2018 to 2019, it was the home stadium for the New Orleans Gold of Major League Rugby under the branding of Gold Stadium.

In 2021, permanent lighting was added to the stadium.

Sports
Football, flag football, lacrosse, rugby and soccer are played at the stadium.

References

American football venues in New Orleans
High school football venues in Louisiana
Lacrosse venues in Louisiana
New Orleans Gold stadiums
Rugby union stadiums in New Orleans
Soccer venues in New Orleans
Sports venues completed in 2018
2018 establishments in Louisiana